Kathryn Drysdale (born 1 December 1981) is an English actress. She gained prominence through her roles in the BBC sitcom Two Pints of Lager and a Packet of Crisps (2001–2009) and the films Vanity Fair (2004) and St Trinian's (2007). Her other work includes the drama Tripping Over (2006), the fourth series of Benidorm (2011) on ITV, the Channel 4 parody The Windsors (2018–2020), and the Netflix period drama Bridgerton (2020–).

On stage, her roles include Grace Shelley in The Ruling Class on the West End opposite James McAvoy, Hermia in A Midsummer Night's Dream, and Lady Katharine in Love's Labour's Lost opposite David Tennant.

Early life
Born to a black father and a white mother, Drysdale was adopted when she was a week old. She was bullied as a child. She trained at the Central School of Speech and Drama.

Career
From 2001 to 2009, Drysdale starred as Louise Brooks in the BBC sitcom Two Pints of Lager and a Packet of Crisps for eight out of nine series of the show. She made her film debut in Mira Nair's 2004 feature adaptation of William Thackeray's Vanity Fair as heiress Rhoda Swartz. In 2006, she played Lizzie in the British-Australian Channel 5 and Network Ten drama Tripping Over and Bliss in the Doctor Who series 2 episode "Love & Monsters". The following year, she played Taylor the Chav in the comedy film St Trinian's.

Also in 2006, Drysdale appeared in Catch at the Royal Court Theatre and in 2008 made her Royal Shakespeare Company debut in A Midsummer Night's Dream and Love's Labour's Lost. In 2009, she appeared in Suddenlossofdignity.com at the Bush Theatre and on tour.

Drysdale joined the main cast of the ITV sitcom Benidorm for its fourth series as Natalie Jones. She played Brownwell in an episode of William Boyd's four-part drama Any Human Heart on Channel 4. In 2012, Drysdale appeared in The Recruiting Officer at the Donmar Warehouse.

Drysdale played Meghan Markle in the second and third series of the Channel 4 parody series The Windsors. She voices the lead character of Bounce in the CBBC animation series Bottersnikes and Gumbles and plays the role of Genevieve Delacroix in Netflix show Bridgerton.

Personal life
Drysdale lives in London. She is a regular speaker at the London contemporary arts academy, 'Acting etc.'

Filmography

Film

Television

Video games

Stage

References

External links 

 
 Kathryn Drysdale at the Artists Partnership
 BBC interview

1978 births
Living people
English film actresses
English people of West Indian descent
Black British actresses
English stage actresses
English television actresses
English adoptees
People from Wigan